Graciela Gil Olivárez (March 9, 1928 – September 19, 1987) was a lawyer and advocate for civil rights and for the poor.

When Olivárez's family moved to Phoenix, Arizona in 1944, she dropped out of high school and then proceeded to hold a position at a women's program director of KIFN, a Spanish-language radio station in 1952.

In 1970, Olivárez became the first woman and the first Latina to graduate from the Notre Dame Law School.  She was offered a scholarship to the school while she was serving as Director of the Arizona branch of the federal Office of Economic Opportunity, despite the fact that she lacked a high school diploma. The Notre Dame Hispanic Law Students Association presents an award in her name annually.

In 1971, Olivárez was elected to the Common Cause National Governing Board.

By 1972, Olivárez had been appointed the director of the University of New Mexico's Institute for Social Research and Development. From 1973 to 1975 she was a professor at the law school and later became New Mexico's State Planning Officer in 1975.

Olivarez served as the chair of the Mexican American Legal Defense and Education Fund, and was one of the first two women on its board.

In 1977, President Jimmy Carter appointed her the director of the Community Services Administration after she had caught Jimmy Carter's attention with Olivárez's efforts to decrease poverty. She thus became the highest-ranking Hispanic woman in the Carter administration.

In 1980 Olivárez left the Carter administration to run her own business, Olivárez television Company, Incorporated. By 1984, she was the owner of a management consulting/public relations firm in Albuquerque, New Mexico.

References

1928 births
1987 deaths
American people of Mexican descent
Notre Dame Law School alumni
American civil rights lawyers
Carter administration personnel
20th-century American lawyers
20th-century American women lawyers